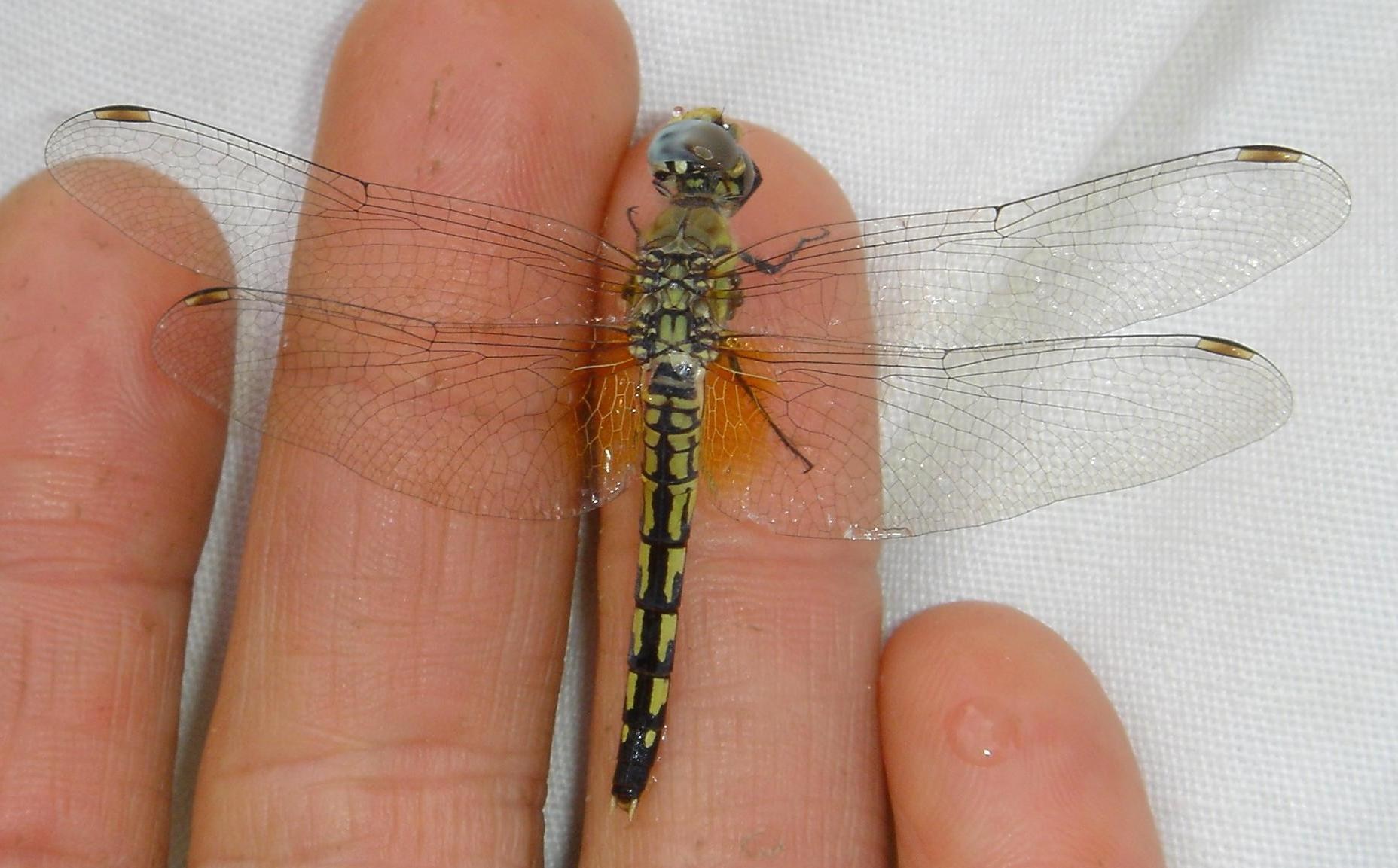
- Philonomon luminans

Scientific classification
- Domain: Eukaryota
- Kingdom: Animalia
- Phylum: Arthropoda
- Class: Insecta
- Order: Odonata
- Infraorder: Anisoptera
- Family: Libellulidae
- Subfamily: Sympetrinae
- Genus: Philonomon

= Philonomon =

Genus of dragonflies

Philonomon is a genus of dragonfly in family Libellulidae. It contains the following species:

- Philonomon luminans
