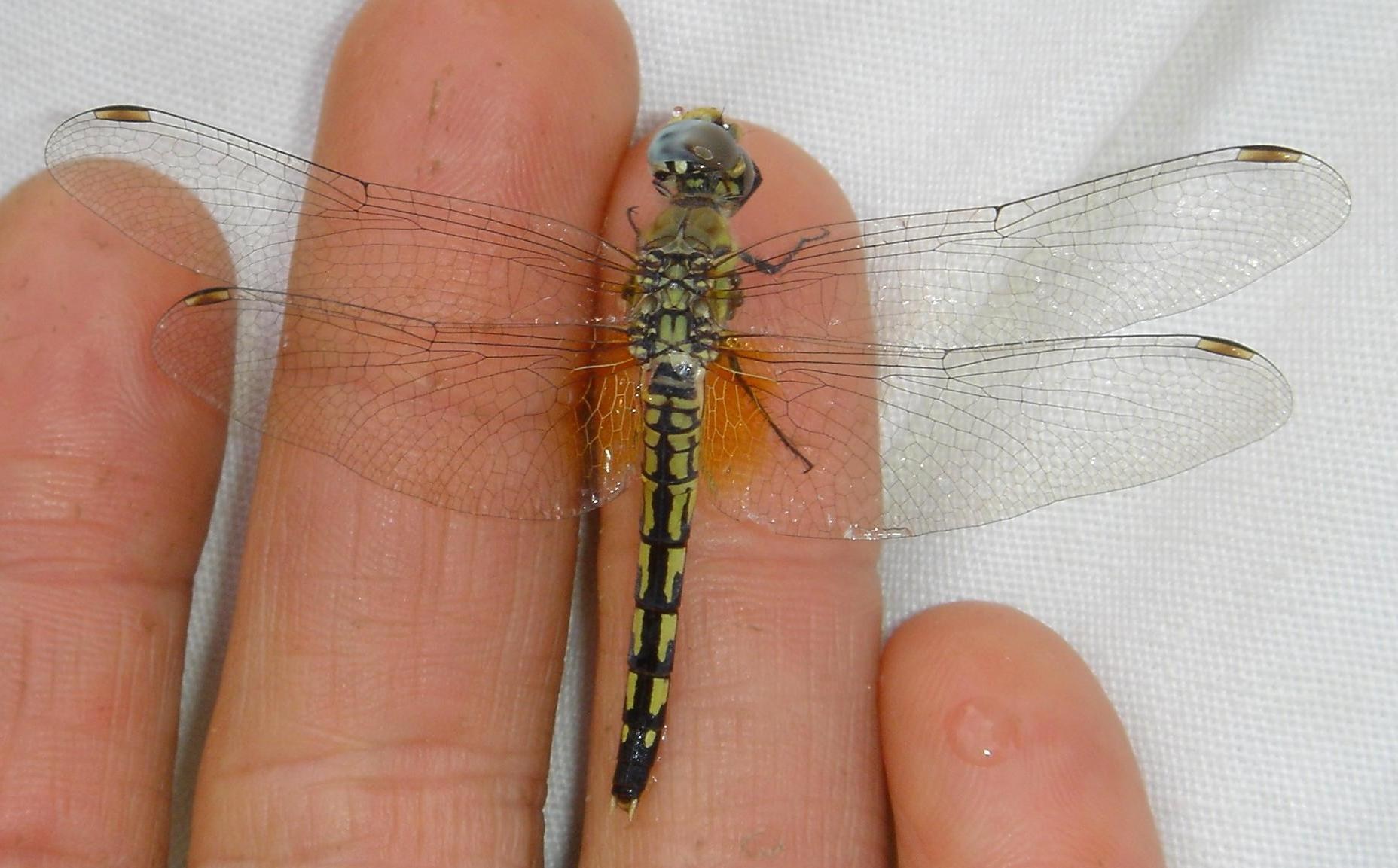
- ♀ Philonomon luminans, Namibia

Conservation status
- Least Concern (IUCN 3.1)

Scientific classification
- Domain: Eukaryota
- Kingdom: Animalia
- Phylum: Arthropoda
- Class: Insecta
- Order: Odonata
- Infraorder: Anisoptera
- Family: Libellulidae
- Genus: Philonomon
- Species: P. luminans

Binomial name
- Philonomon luminans (Karsch, 1893)

= Philonomon luminans =

Species of dragonfly

Philonomon luminans is a species of dragonfly in the family Libellulidae. It is found in South Africa, Central Africa, Democratic Republic of Congo, Equatorial Guinea and Zambia, Encyclopedia of LifeMozambique, Botswana, Namibia, Kenya, Malawi, Tanzania, Uganda, and possibly Burundi. Its natural habitats are dry savanna, moist savanna, subtropical or tropical dry shrubland, subtropical or tropical moist shrubland, shrub-dominated wetlands, swamps, freshwater marshes, and intermittent freshwater marshes.
